James Floyd may refer to:

 James Floyd (actor) (born 1985), British actor
 James C. Floyd (born 1914), Canadian aerospace engineer
 John Floyd (pioneer) (James John Floyd, 1750–1783), pioneer of the Midwestern United States
 James H. Floyd (1920–1974), American politician
 James H. Floyd State Park, Summerville, Georgia
 J. T. Floyd (born 1989), American football player
 James R. Floyd, chief executive of Muscogee (Creek) Nation
 Jim Bob Floyd (born 1929), American concert pianist